Live in Chicago is a live DVD by Jeff Buckley, recorded on May 13, 1995 at Cabaret Metro during the Mystery White Boy tour. Soul Coughing co-headlined the show, and only audio of their set was recorded. Originally broadcast on Chicago music video program JBTV, it was released on DVD and VHS on May 9, 2000. In 2007 it was re-released with a different cover to accompany the release of So Real: Songs from Jeff Buckley.

Track listing

Live at Cabaret Metro, Chicago
 "Dream Brother" (Jeff Buckley, Mick Grondahl, Matt Johnson)
 "Lover, You Should've Come Over" (Jeff Buckley)
 "Mojo Pin" (Jeff Buckley, Gary Lucas)
 "So Real" (Jeff Buckley, Michael Tighe)
 "Last Goodbye" (Jeff Buckley)
 "Eternal Life (Jeff Buckley)
 "Kick Out the Jams" (MC5)
 "Lilac Wine" (James Shelton (songwriter))
 "What Will You Say" (Jeff Buckley, Carla Azar, Chris Dowd)
 "Grace" (Jeff Buckley, Gary Lucas)
 "Vancouver" (instrumental) (Jeff Buckley, Mick Grondahl, Michael Tighe)
 "Kanga Roo" (Big Star)
 "Hallelujah" (Leonard Cohen)

Bonus material
 "So Real" (acoustic) (Recorded November 19, 1994)
 "Last Goodbye" (acoustic) (Recorded November 19, 1994)
 Previously unreleased electronic press kit (EPK)
 Discography

Personnel
 Jeff Buckley – vocals, guitar
 Michael Tighe – guitar
 Mick Grondahl – bass guitar
 Matt Johnson – drums

Certifications

Jeff Buckley albums
Live video albums
2000 live albums
2000 video albums
Columbia Records live albums
Columbia Records video albums